Joël Henry may refer to:
 Joël Henry (journalist) (born 1955), French journalist
 Joël Henry (footballer) (born 1962), French footballer

See also